GO Show was a South Korean talk show which began airing on April 6, 2012 on Friday nights at 11:05 pm KST on SBS. It is hosted by famed actress, Go Hyun-jung, who starred in highly rated dramas such as Sandglass and Queen Seondeok. This is the first talk show she has hosted, with the help of comedians Jung Hyung-don, Kim Young-chul, and Yoon Jong-shin. Originally, only 25 episodes were ordered by SBS, ending the show in early October. However, with a solid audience and Go Hyun-jung's improving hosting skills, the show has been renewed until the end of year. The program ended with 35 episodes on December 21, 2012.

Format 
Each episode surrounds the production company, Go, who despite its lack of hit stars, has still managed to survive with its solid movies. The owner of the company, Go Hyun-jung, seeks to recruit new stars to her company through auditions each week for certain movies. Celebrities are brought to the audition by Kim Young-chul, and are met by the company's only star, Jung Hyung-don, and manager, Yoon Jong-shin. Celebrities attempt to be cast for the week's movie by showing their skills to match with the movie's theme.

List of episodes

References

External links 
 GO Show Official Homepage 

Seoul Broadcasting System original programming
South Korean television talk shows
2012 South Korean television series debuts
2012 South Korean television series endings
Korean-language television shows
Television series by IOK Media